Welshampton and Lyneal is a civil parish in Shropshire, England. The population of the civil parish at the 2011 census was 852.

The current parish is the result of a controversial merger of an older parish, Welshampton, with part of Ellesmere Rural parish.

See also
Listed buildings in Welshampton and Lyneal

References

Civil parishes in Shropshire